Bayou Goula is an unincorporated community and census-designated place (CDP) in Iberville Parish, Louisiana, United States. Its population was 612 as of the 2010 census.

Bayou Goula is a name derived from the Choctaw language meaning "river people".

Geography
The community is in eastern Iberville Parish, on the west bank of the Mississippi River.

Demographics

References

Unincorporated communities in Iberville Parish, Louisiana
Unincorporated communities in Louisiana
Census-designated places in Iberville Parish, Louisiana
Census-designated places in Louisiana